Marianne Zechmeister (born 12 April 1960, in Berchtesgaden) is a German former alpine skier who competed in the women's downhill at the 1980 Winter Olympics.

External links
 sports-reference.com
 

1960 births
Living people
People from Berchtesgaden
Sportspeople from Upper Bavaria
Olympic alpine skiers of West Germany
Alpine skiers at the 1980 Winter Olympics
German female alpine skiers
20th-century German women